Salamanca is a city in Spain.

Salamanca may also refer to:

Places

Spain

 Province of Salamanca, a province of Spain, of which the above city is the capital
 Salamanca (Madrid), a neighborhood and district in the Spanish capital

Australia
 Salamanca Place, a waterfront district of Hobart, Tasmania
 Salamanca Market, held in Salamanca Place

Panama
Salamanca, Colón

Peru
 Salamanca, Lima, a neighborhood in the district of Ate in Lima
 Salamanca District, a district of Condesuyos in Arequipa

United States
 Salamanca (city), New York
 Salamanca (town), New York

Other places
 Salamanca, Chile, a town in Choapa Province
 Island of Salamanca, Colombia, a national park island near Barranquilla, connected by the Pumarejo bridge
 Salamanca, Guanajuato, Mexico, a major town in the state of Guanajuato
 Salamanca (town), Venezuela

People
 Amaia Salamanca (born 1986), actress
 Antonio Salamanca (1479-1562), 16th-century Italian print publisher
 Carlos Salamanca (born 1983), Colombian professional tennis player
 Daniel Salamanca (1869–1935), Bolivian president
 Gabriel von Salamanca-Ortenburg (1489–1539), general treasurer of the Habsburg archduke Ferdinand I of Austria
 José de Salamanca, 1st Count of los Llanos (1811–1883), Spanish nobleman, politician and businessman
 Manuel Silvestre de Salamanca Cano (d. 1775), governor of the Captaincy General of Chile

Fictional characters
 The fictional Salamanca crime family from the American television shows Breaking Bad and Better Call Saul
 Hector Salamanca
 Tuco Salamanca
 Leonel Salamanca
 Marco Salamanca
 Lalo Salamanca

Other uses
 Salamanca, the world's first commercially successful steam locomotive
 Salamanca, cave that appears in numerous Hispanic American legends.
 University of Salamanca, in Salamanca, Spain
 School of Salamanca, a 16th-century intellectual group based in Spain
 Battle of Salamanca, a battle fought in 1812
 UD Salamanca, a former Spanish football team
 , a number of ships with this name
 Salamanca Formation, a Paleocene geological formation in Argentina